The 2003 Esiliiga is the 13th season of the Esiliiga, second-highest Estonian league for association football clubs, since its establishment in 1992.

Final table of Esiliiga season 2003

Promotion playoff

FC Valga beat JK Tervis Pärnu 5–2 on aggregate. Vaga stayed in Meistriliiga, Tervis in Esiliiga.

Relegation playoff

FC TVMK II Tallinn beat FC Merkuur Tartu 6–2 on aggregate. TVMK II promoted to Esiliiga, Merkuur relegated to Second Division.

Top goalscorers 

29 – Aleksei Titov (Estel)
20 – Kristjan Tiirik (Tammeka)
17 – Sergei Popov (Lootus)
15 – Nikolai Toštšev (Lootus)
13 – Jarmo Ahjupera (Tervis)
13 – Sergei Bragin (Estel)
12 – Aleksandr Kulik (Tervis)
12 – Anton Semjonov (Lootus)
11 – Marek Markson (Vaprus)
11 – Ott Purje (M.C.)
11 – Juri Volkov (TJK)
10 – Aleksandr Ivanov (TJK)

See also
 2003 Meistriliiga

Esiliiga seasons
2
Estonia
Estonia